Sex & Philosophy (Original title: Sex O Phalsapheh) is a 2005 internationally co-produced film directed, written and produced by Mohsen Makhmalbaf. Starring Daler Nazarov, Mariam Gaibova, and Farzona Beknazarova, the film is set in Tajikistan.  Sex & Philosophy premiered at the Montreal World Film Festival  in September 2005. It saw a theatrical release in South Korea, Turkey, Italy, Singapore and Russia. Sex & Philosophy was Tajikistan's official selection for the 

گلم  but it was disqualified because English subtitles were not added to the film in the time allowed by the Academy.

Plot
In the midst of a mid-life crisis Jan, a 40-year-old dancing teacher, decides to tell his four lovers about each other. He gathers them together to explain his actions, going into details about why he first started his affairs with each of them. He gives them each a watch and they leave. Later, he discovers that one of his lovers was also having an affair with three other men when she calls him to a similar meeting and begins explaining why she begins an affair with each of them.

Cast
Daler Nazarov as Jan
Mariam Gaibova
Farzona Beknazarova
Tahmineh Ebrahimova
Malohat Abdulloeva
Nadira Abdullaeva
Ali Akbar Abdulloev
Dilafruz Burkhanova
Lutfullo Davlat
Malika Gadoeva
Nika Gafurova
Gulrukhsor Gayurova
Turana Ismail
Tamanno Karimova
Nodira Mazitova
Nasiba Nasimova
Ahliddin Sharipov
Neekqadam Shohnazarov
Zarina Shugaipova
Nikolai Tibikin
Margarita Yen

Awards
 2005 Nomination for the Grand Prix des Amériques at the Montreal World Film Festival

References

External links
 

Tajikistani drama films
Iranian drama films
2005 films
2005 drama films
Tajik-language films
2000s Russian-language films
French drama films
Films directed by Mohsen Makhmalbaf
Films set in Tajikistan
2000s French films